Bunny Gets Paid is the third studio album by Red Red Meat, released in 1995 by Sub Pop. The band supported the album by touring with the Grifters.

Critical reception
The St. Louis Post-Dispatch called the album "a muddy, perilous trek through a swamp of towering power chords, tangled acoustic guitars and slithering bass lines." The Austin American-Statesman praised the "unique slide-guitar techniques and clever, moody songs." The Chicago Tribune noted the "chamber-rock mystical" qualities of the album, as well as "the friends-in-a-room vibe." The Philadelphia Inquirer deemed it "a mix of subtly charged blues and all-out garage rock."

Track listing

Vinyl Reissue Jealous Butcher Bonus Tracks Cat. No. JB117 also on the Sub Pop bonus disk

Personnel
Adapted from the Bunny Gets Paid liner notes.

Red Red Meat
 Brian Deck – piano, drums, vocals, musical direction, arrangements, mixing
 Tim Hurley – bass guitar, guitar, piano, vocals
 Ben Massarella – drums
 Tim Rutili – guitar, violin, piano, vocals

Additional musicians
 Russ Bassman – Moog synthesizer, organ
 Julie Pomerleau – violin
 Neil Rosario – guitar
Production and additional personnel
 Keith Cleversley – engineering, mixing
 Marty Perez – photography
 Casey Rice – engineering, mixing, synthesizer
 Brad Wood – production, engineering, mixing, synthesizer, piano

Release history

References

External links 
 

1995 albums
Red Red Meat albums
Sub Pop albums
Albums produced by Brad Wood